Ylva Julia Margareta Johansson (born 13 February 1964) is a Swedish politician who has been serving as European Commissioner for Home Affairs since 2019. She previously served in the government of Sweden as Minister for Schools from 1994 to 1998, as Minister for Welfare and Elderly Healthcare from 2004 to 2006, and as Minister for Employment from 2014 to 2019. She has been a member of the Swedish Riksdag since 2006.

Education and early career 
Johansson studied at Lund University and the Stockholm Institute of Education between 1983–88 and 1991–92 respectively, and holds a Master of Science degree in education. Upon graduating, she worked as a math, physics, and chemistry teacher.

Political career

Early beginnings
In the 1988 general elections Johansson was elected as a member of the Riksdag for the Left Party - Communists (VPK). She later left the party and joined the Social Democrats.

From 1992 to 1994 Johansson worked as a teacher, until Prime Minister Ingvar Carlsson made her Minister for Schools in his government. In 1998, she and the then Minister for Finance Erik Åsbrink announced their wish to "publicly confirm that we are in love" and their intention to separate from their respective partners. Soon afterwards, Johansson left the government. The following years, she worked in the private sector.

In 2004, Prime Minister Göran Persson appointed Johansson to the government in a new position, as Minister for Health and Elderly Care, succeeding Lars Engqvist.

Minister of Employment, 2014–2019 
From 2014, Johansson served as Minister for Employment in the government of Prime Minister Stefan Löfven. During her time in office, she worked to tighten labor immigration laws.

In the 2013 Social Democrat party congress, the goal was set that Sweden should have the lowest rate of unemployment in the EU. While the Social Democrats and Green Party were in power, unemployment decreased more in other EU countries than Sweden and by 2019, Sweden's place in the unemployment ranking slipped to 18 with an unemployment rate of 6.2%, where the first spot was occupied by Czech Republic at 1.7%.

Member of the European Commission, 2019–present 
Following the 2019 European elections, Löfven nominated Johansson as Sweden's candidate for the post of European Commissioner.

During a question & answer session in October 2019 in the European Parliament, Johansson was asked on whether Swedish policy on gang crime and migration would be exported to the EU level. Johansson responded that she was "proud that Sweden received so many refugees".

In early March 2020, Johansson was appointed by President Ursula von der Leyen to serve on a special task force to coordinate the European Union's response to the COVID-19 pandemic.

Political positions
Johansson has been described as the "left wing of the Social Democrats".

In a September 2020 EU debate on the new migration pact she said "we have a lot of migration to the European Union, and we need that" because of the ageing of Europe, while also noting that "those that are not eligible to stay, they have to leave; not everybody that has a right to apply for asylum has the right to stay in the European Union".

In May 2022, Johansson proposed legislation to introduce an obligation for companies to monitor all private chat communication, including pictures, for possible hints at child abuse and report any findings to the authorities. The proposed legislation faced widespread criticism and was described as introducing mass surveillance. The scientific service of the German Bundestag evaluated the proposal and concluded it was illegal due to necessitating blanket surveillance of private communinication, the impossibility to differentiate legal and illegal communication and harmful effects on communication by and between children. Johansson defended her proposal to scan all electronic chats as not introducing surveillance, which was - among other claims - described as untrue or at least misleading.

Personal life 
Johansson has two children with her former husband Bo Hammar and a son with Erik Åsbrink. She is an honorary member of the Swedish football club Hammarby IF.

References

External links
Ylva Johansson- Information page on the Swedish Government web site
Regeringens heta romans - Article in Aftonbladet, September 23, 1998 on Ylva Johansson's and Erik Åsbrink's press release. (In Swedish)
Ylva Johansson at the Riksdag website

|-

|-

|-

|-

|-

1964 births
21st-century Swedish women politicians
Living people
People from Huddinge Municipality
Swedish European Commissioners
Swedish Ministers for Employment
Members of the Riksdag from the Social Democrats
Women European Commissioners
Women government ministers of Sweden
Women members of the Riksdag
European Commissioners 2019–2024
Lund University alumni
Stockholm University alumni
Female interior ministers